Anthracus derogatus is an insect-eating ground beetle of the genus Anthracus. It was discovered in Sri Lanka.

References

derogatus
Beetles described in 1858